François Leleux (born July 1971 in Croix, Nord) is a French oboist, conductor, and professor. His professional career began at 18 when he became principal oboe at the Paris Opera. He went on to win a solo position at the Bavarian Radio Symphony Orchestra and currently does some concerts with the Chamber Orchestra of Europe as well as putting out CDs. He is married to violinist Lisa Batiashvili.

References

External links 
Official Website

1971 births
Living people
People from Croix, Nord
French classical oboists
Male oboists
French male conductors (music)
21st-century French conductors (music)
21st-century French male musicians